Lucas Domínguez Irarrázabal (born 27 October 1989) is a retired Chilean former professional footballer who played as a centre back and his last team was Chilean Primera División club Deportes La Serena. Domínguez has been capped by Chile at international level.

Club career

Audax Italiano
After of many years in Audax Italiano lower divisions, Domínguez was promoted to the first team of the club in June 2008. Domínguez he officially debut for the club in the fourth round of the Copa Chile 2008–09 against Santiago Wanderers, aged 19, in a 2–2 draw on 23 October. In the same match, he scored his first senior goal for Audax in the 51st minute. On 9 March 2009, he made his Chilean Primera Division debut, playing the 90 minutes in a 3–3 draw against Municipal Iquique.

In the next season, Domínguez was a frequently player in Audax's starting lineup, being a key player in the club, devoting in his position. On 18 March 2010, he scored his first competitive goal for Primera Division in a 5–1 victory over Ñublense at Nelson Oyarzún Stadium. Domínguez made an important role as defender in the 3–2 victory of Audax against Universidad Católica, he also scored the momentary draw 1–1 with an impressive header.

International career
In 2008, he represented Chile U23 at the 2008 Inter Continental Cup in Malaysia.

Domínguez made his debut for Chilean senior team on 22 January 2011 against the United States at The Home Depot Center in Carson. He came on as a second-half substitute, replacing Daúd Gazale after 71 minutes.

Personal life
He lives with his family in Pirque and practices playing the piano to relax.

References

External links
 

1989 births
Living people
Footballers from Santiago
Chilean people of Basque descent
Chilean footballers
Chile international footballers
Chilean expatriate footballers
Association football defenders
Audax Italiano footballers
Colo-Colo B footballers
Colo-Colo footballers
Everton de Viña del Mar footballers
SD Ponferradina players
Club Deportivo Palestino footballers
Unión Española footballers
Pafos FC players
Rangers de Talca footballers
Deportes La Serena footballers
Chilean Primera División players
Segunda División Profesional de Chile players
Segunda División players
Cypriot First Division players
Primera B de Chile players
Expatriate footballers in Spain
Chilean expatriate sportspeople in Spain
Expatriate footballers in Cyprus
Chilean expatriate sportspeople in Cyprus
People from Santiago